Tawfik Bahri (( July 28, 1952 - December 18, 2021) was a Tunisian actor. He was best known for playing the role of Béji Matrix in the series .
Born in July 28,1952

Filmography

Cinema
Les Zazous de la vague (1992)
Talfaza Jaya (2006)
Making Of (2006)
Les Palmiers blessés (2010)
 (2010)
Patience amère (2012)
Bastardo (2013)
Parfum de printemps (2016)
Porto Farina (2019)

Television
 (2002)
 (2005–2009)
 (2012)
 (2014–2015)

References

External links
 

1952 births
2021 deaths
Tunisian male film actors
Tunisian male television actors
21st-century Tunisian male actors